LGA 1156 (land grid array 1156), also known as Socket H or H1, is an Intel desktop CPU socket. Its incompatible successor is LGA 1155.

The last processors supporting it ceased production in 2011. 

LGA 1156, along with LGA 1366, were designed to replace LGA 775. Whereas LGA 775 processors connect to a northbridge using the Front Side Bus, LGA 1156 processors integrate the features traditionally located on a northbridge within the processor itself.  The LGA 1156 socket allows the following connections to be made from the processor to the rest of the system:

 PCI-Express 2.0 ×16 for communication with a graphics card.  Some processors allow this connection to be divided into two ×8 lanes to connect two graphics cards.  Some motherboard manufacturers use Nvidia's NF200 chip to allow even more graphics cards to be used.
 DMI for communication with the Platform Controller Hub (PCH).  This consists of a PCI-Express 2.0 ×4 connection.
 FDI for communication with the PCH. This consists of two DisplayPort connections.
 Two memory channels for communication with DDR3 SDRAM.  The clock speed of the memory that is supported will depend on the processor.

The LGA 1366 platform reached EOL on June 29, 2012. LGA 1156 reached EOL on December 7, 2012.

Heatsink 
For LGA 1156 the 4 holes for fastening the heatsink to the motherboard are placed in a square with a lateral length of 75 mm. This configuration was retained for the later, LGA 1155, LGA 1150, LGA 1151, and LGA 1200 sockets meaning that cooling solutions should generally be interchangeable.

Supported processors

All LGA 1156 processors and motherboards made to date are interoperable, making it possible to switch between a Celeron, Pentium, Core i3 or Core i5 with integrated graphics and a Core i5 or Core i7 without graphics. However, using a chip with integrated graphics on a P55 motherboard will (in addition to likely requiring a BIOS update) not allow use of the on-board graphics processor, and likewise, using a chip without integrated graphics on a H55, H57 or Q57 motherboard will not allow use of the motherboard's graphics ports.

Supported chipsets

The Desktop chipsets that officially support LGA 1156 are Intel's H55, H57, P55, and Q57. Server chipsets supporting the socket are Intel's 3400, 3420 and 3450.

Some small Chinese manufacturers are producing LGA 1156 motherboards based on H61 chipset, and ASRock, for very short time, produced LGA 1156 motherboard based on P67 chipset, the P67 Transformer. It exclusively supports Lynnfield processors and was discontinued after B2 revision of 6 series chipsets was recalled, not receiving a version with B3 revision of P67 chipset.

See also
 List of Intel microprocessors
 List of Intel Core i3 microprocessors
 List of Intel Core i5 microprocessors
 List of Intel Core i7 microprocessors
 List of Intel Pentium microprocessors
 List of Intel Celeron microprocessors
 List of Intel Xeon microprocessors
 Clarkdale (microprocessor)
 Lynnfield (microprocessor)
 LGA 775
 LGA 1366
 LGA 1155

Notes

References

External links 
 Intel desktop processor integration overview (LGA115x)

Intel CPU sockets